Drewniak is a surname. Notable people with the surname include:

 Michael Drewniak, American press secretary to the Governor of New Jersey
 Szymon Drewniak (born 1993), Polish footballer

Polish-language surnames